is a passenger railway station  located in the city of Sakaiminato, Tottori Prefecture, Japan. It is operated by the West Japan Railway Company (JR West). The station is within walking distance of the Yonago Airport terminal.

Lines

Station layout
The station consists of one ground-level side platform located on the left side of the tracks when facing in the direction of Sakaiminato. The station is unattended.

Adjacent stations

History
The station was moved to the present location and renamed Yonago Airport Station on June 15, 2008, when the line was rerouted for the expansion of Yonago Airport.

Passenger statistics
In fiscal 2018, the station was used by an average of 388 passengers daily.

Surrounding area
 Miho-Yonago Airport

See also
List of railway stations in Japan

References

External links 

  Yonago Airport Station from JR-Odekake.net 

Railway stations in Japan opened in 1902
Railway stations in Tottori Prefecture
Stations of West Japan Railway Company
Sakaiminato, Tottori
Airport railway stations in Japan